The 1998 Hawaii gubernatorial election was held on November 3, 1998. Incumbent Democratic Governor of Hawaii Ben Cayetano ran for re-election to a second and final term, and he was contested by Maui Mayor Linda Lingle. The race between Cayetano and Lingle was close, with Lingle holding a sizable polling advantage. Ultimately, Cayetano narrowly won re-election to a second term in the closest gubernatorial election in Hawaii's history. This election, along with the 1966 election, marks the only time a Democrat was elected governor without sweeping every county in the state.

Democratic primary

Candidates
Ben Cayetano, incumbent Governor of Hawaii
Jim Brewer, perennial candidate
Richard C. S. Ho, former Hawaii State Representative
Fred K. Tamura
Raymond N. Onaga
Miles F. Shiratori, perennial candidate

Results

Republican primary

Candidates
Linda Lingle, Mayor of Maui
Frank Fasi, former Mayor of Honolulu

Results

General election

Results

References

1998
Gubernatorial
1998 United States gubernatorial elections